Common Crawl is a nonprofit 501(c)(3) organization that crawls the web and freely provides its archives and datasets to the public. Common Crawl's web archive consists of petabytes of data collected since 2011. It completes crawls generally every month.

Common Crawl was founded by Gil Elbaz. Advisors to the non-profit include Peter Norvig and Joi Ito. The organization's crawlers respect nofollow and robots.txt policies. Open source code for processing Common Crawl's data set is publicly available.

The Common Crawl dataset includes copyrighted work and is distributed from the US under fair use claims. Researchers in other countries have made use of techniques such as shuffling sentences or referencing the common crawl dataset to work around copyright law in other legal jurisdictions.

History
Amazon Web Services began hosting Common Crawl's archive through its Public Data Sets program in 2012.

The organization began releasing metadata files and the text output of the crawlers alongside .arc files in July of that year. Common Crawl's archives had only included .arc files previously.

In December 2012, blekko donated to Common Crawl search engine metadata blekko gathered from crawls it conducted from February to October 2012. The donated data helped Common Crawl "improve its crawl while avoiding spam, porn and the influence of excessive SEO."
 
In 2013, Common Crawl began using Apache Software Foundation's Nutch webcrawler instead of a custom crawler. Common Crawl switched from using .arc files to .warc files with its November 2013 crawl.

A filtered version of Common Crawl was used to train OpenAI's GPT-3 language model, announced in 2020. One challenge of using Common Crawl data is that despite the vast amount of documented web data, individual pieces of crawled websites could be better documented. This can create challenges when trying to diagnose problems in projects that use the Common Crawl data. A solution proposed by Timnit Gebru, et al., in 2020 to an industry-wide documentation shortfall is that every dataset should be accompanied with a datasheet that documents its motivation, composition, collection process, and recommended uses.

History of Common Crawl data

The following data have been collected from the official Common Crawl Blog.

Norvig Web Data Science Award
In corroboration with SURFsara, Common Crawl sponsors the Norvig Web Data Science Award, a competition open to students and researchers in Benelux. The award is named for Peter Norvig who also chairs the judging committee for the award.

References

External links
Common Crawl in California, United States
Common Crawl GitHub Repository with the crawler, libraries and example code
Common Crawl Discussion Group
Common Crawl Blog

Internet-related organizations
Web archiving
Web archiving initiatives